Germana is an Italian female name. Notable people with the name include:
 
 Germana Caroli (born 1931), Italian singer
 Germana Malabarba, Italian gymnast
 Germana Marucelli, Italian fashion designer
 Germana Paolieri, Italian actress
 Saint Germaine Cousin (1579–1601), French saint.
 Saint Grimonia, 4th-century Irish martyr
 

Italian feminine given names